Daniel Rodrigues may refer to:

Dan Rodrigues (born 1975), CEO and founder of Irvine, CA-based Kareo, a developer of medical practice management software
Daniel Marins Rodrigues (born 1988), Brazilian footballer  for Figueirense
Dani Rodrigues (born 1980), Portuguese footballer for Doxa Katokopias F.C.

See also
Daniel Rodriguez (disambiguation)